The Ii antigen system is a human blood group system based upon a gene on chromosome 6 and consisting of the I antigen and the i antigen. The I antigen is normally present on the cell membrane of red blood cells in all adults, while the i antigen is present in fetuses and newborns.

I and i antigens 
Adult red blood cells express I antigen abundantly. Developing fetuses and newborns express i antigen until around 13-20 months after birth, when I antigen starts to be expressed instead. Like ABH antigens, which make up the ABO blood group, I and i antigens are not restricted to the red blood cell membrane, but are found on most human cells and in body fluids such as saliva.

The I and i antigens are carbohydrate structures composed of repeating units of N-acetyllactosamine (LacNAc), and are located on the interior of structures carrying ABH and Lewis antigens. LacNAc repeats are made by the enzymes B3GNT1 and B4GALT1. The i antigen is made of linear repeats, while the structure of the I antigen is branched. Unlike most other blood groups, the two antigens are not encoded by different alleles; rather, I-branching enzyme converts i antigen to I antigen by adding branches. The gene encoding I-branching enzyme is located on chromosome 6.

Clinical significance 
The function of I and i antigens are unknown but may be related to hematopoiesis, the production of blood. The rapid conversion from i to I antigens after birth suggests that I antigen plays an important role in adult red blood cells. The presence of the linear i antigen in fetuses, rather than the branched I antigen, may have developed as an evolutionary mechanism to prevent ABO hemolytic disease of the fetus and newborn. Enhanced expression of i antigen is associated with conditions involving stress hematopoiesis such as leukemia and sickle cell disease.

Transient autoantibodies against I antigen are common, especially after infection by Mycoplasma pneumoniae, and are rarely significant except in cold agglutinin disease. Transient antibodies against i antigen are common after infectious mononucleosis and are also not clinically significant. Antibodies which recognize both I and i antigens are termed anti-j antibodies.

Cold agglutinin disease 

The autoantibodies involved in cold agglutinin disease are usually against I antigen. The antibodies are usually IgM (kappa subtype), unlike transient autoantibodies which are generally IgG. Cold-reactive IgM antibodies (cold agglutinins) bind to I antigen on red blood cells, and unlike IgG, are able to cause agglutination of red blood cells and activate complement to cause hemolysis, leading to anemia.

Adult i phenotype 
Rarely, individuals have the i antigen on their red blood cells into adulthood, known as the adult i phenotype. This is due to the presence of a mutation in the GCNT2 gene which encodes the I-branching enzyme. These individuals have alloantibodies against the I antigen, though these are typically cold agglutinins and are unlikely to cause transfusion reactions.

The adult i phenotype is associated with congenital cataracts, most markedly in Japanese and Taiwanese people and least markedly in Caucasian people. Cataracts occur when i antigen rather than I antigen is present on the epithelium of the lens, due to a mutation in the form of the I-branching enzyme which is expressed in lens epithelium, IGNTB.

The adult i phenotype is inherited in a recessive manner.

History 
The I antigen was first described in 1956 and the i antigen was discovered in 1960. I and i were the first discovered antigens which change significantly during human development. The letter I was chosen to reflect the "individuality" of a person studied who lacked the I antigen.

Other species 
A similar blood group system with a developmental change resembling the Ii system (with human neonatal cells expressing i antigen and adult cells expressing I antigen) has been observed in most primates, including chimpanzees and monkeys. This is not seen in non-primates: cats, dogs, or guinea pigs.

References

External links 
 Ii at BGMUT Blood Group Antigen Gene Mutation Database at NCBI, NIH

Blood antigen systems
Transfusion medicine
Genes on human chromosome 6